The Malaysia–Singapore border is an international maritime border between the Southeast Asian countries of Malaysia, which lies to the north of the border, and Singapore to the south. The boundary is formed by straight lines between maritime geographical coordinates running along or near the deepest channel of the Straits of Johor.

The western portion of the border beyond that delimited by the 1995 agreement goes into the western section of the Straits of Singapore while the eastern portion of the border beyond the eastern terminus of the defined border continues into the eastern section of the straits. Outside the border defined by the 1995 agreement, there is still no formal agreement between the two countries to delimit their common borders and this has resulted in several overlapping claims. Singapore claims a territorial sea limit that extends up to 12 nautical miles and an exclusive economic zone (EEZ), while Malaysia claims a 12 nautical-mile (22 km) territorial sea limit.

Following the International Court of Justice (ICJ) decision on 23 May 2008 over Pedra Branca which recognised Singapore's sovereignty on the island, the new portion of the Malaysia–Singapore maritime eastern border around the island will also need to be determined.

There are two structural crossings along the border. They are the Johor–Singapore Causeway and the Malaysia–Singapore Second Link (officially known as Tuas Second Link in Singapore). There are also international ferry and bumboat services between Pengerang at the southeastern tip of Johor, Malaysia and Changi at the eastern end of Singapore.

The border

Delimited boundary
A large extent of the Malaysia–Singapore border is defined by the Agreement between the Government of Malaysia and the Government of the Republic of Singapore to delimit precisely the territorial waters boundary in accordance with the Straits Settlement and Johore Territorial Waters Agreement 1927 as being straight lines joining a series of 72 geographical coordinates roughly running about  along the deepest channel (thalweg) between the western and eastern entrances of the Straits of Johor. This delineation was arrived at and agreed to jointly by the two governments and resulted in the agreement being signed on 7 August 1995.

The coordinates, which are stated in Annex 1 of the agreement, are listed below. The datum used is the Revised Kertau Datum, Everest Spheroid (Malaya), Malaysian Rectified Skew Orthomorphic projection.

The Straits Settlement and Johore Territorial Waters Agreement of 1927 signed between the Britain and the Sultanate of Johor on 19 October 1927, defines the territorial sea border between Malaysia and Singapore as:

"... an imaginary line following the centre of the deep-water channel in Johore Strait, between the mainland of the State and Territory of Johore on the one side, and the northern shores of the islands of Singapore, Pulau Ubin, Pulau Tekong Kechil, and Pulau Tekong Besar on the other side. Where, if at all, the channel divides into two portions of equal depth running side by side, the boundary shall run midway between these two portions. At the western entrance of Johore Strait, the boundary, after passing through the centre of the deep-water channel eastward of Pulau Merambong, shall proceed seaward, in the general direction of the axis of this channel produced, until it intersects the  limit drawn from the low water mark of the south coast of Pulau Merambong. At the Eastern entrance of Johore Strait, the boundary shall be held to pass through the centre of the deep-water channel between the mainland of Johore, westward of Johore Hill, and Pulau Tekong Besar, next through the centre of the deep-water channel between Johore Shoal and the mainland of Johore, southward of Johore Hill, and finally turning southward, to intersect the  limit drawn from the low water mark of the mainland of Johore in a position bearing 192 degrees from Tanjong Sitapa."

The boundary drawn by the 1995 agreement follows closely but, by virtue of being straight lines between points, does not exactly correspond with the deepest channel of the Straits of Johor as described in the 1927 agreement. As the 1995 agreement supersedes the 1927 agreement as far as any inconsistency goes, the thalweg method of determining the precise borderline is therefore replaced with the use of geographical coordinates. The 1995 agreement also states that the border will be final and, therefore, not be influenced by any variation of the depth or alignment of the deepest channel of the Straits of Johor. This is important considering frequent reclamation activities by both Malaysia and Singapore in the Straits of Johor which could alter the depth of the waterway.

Undetermined boundaries
The border outside the points agreed to in the 1995 agreement has not been determined and is subject to some level of contention. In 1979, Malaysia published a map unilaterally defining its territorial waters and continental shelf, and "picks up" from where the 1927 agreement left off as far as the Malaysia–Singapore border is concerned. In 2018, Malaysia published in its Federal Government Gazette changes to the Johor Bahru port limits that extrapolated from the 1995 territorial waters agreement. Malaysia's Marine Department further issued a Notice to Mariners detailing the changes in the port limits. The unilateral move drew a strong protest from Singapore's Maritime and Port Authority (MPA) who asked the mariners to ignore that notice. Singapore's Ministry of Transport (MOT) added in a statement that Malaysia was "encroaching into Singapore's territorial waters off Tuas".

Western segment

According to the 1979 map, on the western entrance to the Straits of Johor, the border starts at "Point 21", which lies near the western terminus of the border as defined by the 1927 agreement and the terminus of the border agreed to in the 1995 agreement (known as Point W25). The Malaysian border then extends southwards until "Point 17" where it then goes northeasterly till it meets the southern terminus of the Indonesia-Malaysia border delimited by the Indonesia-Malaysia continental shelf boundary agreement of 1969 and the Indonesia-Malaysia territorial waters agreement of 1971. The border between Malaysia and Singapore only runs between "Point 21" and "Point 15" where it should intersect the Indonesia-Singapore maritime border. The meeting point of the maritime territories between the three countries has not been determined.

Eastern segment

The eastern continuation of the territorial waters border defined by the 1979 Malaysian map starts near the eastern terminus of the 1927 agreement border at "Point 22", whereby it goes westwards towards Singapore to "Point 23" before travelling southeasterly towards its southmost point at "Point 27". It then continues in a general easterly direction to meet the southern terminus of the Indonesia-Malaysia border as defined by their continental shelf boundary agreement of 1969. The Indonesia-Singapore border should intersect this boundary at some point but the meeting point of the maritime territories of the three countries has not been determined.

Malaysia's maritime boundary in its 1979 map is not recognised by Singapore and Singapore disputes many parts of the territorial sea and continental shelf claimed by Malaysia. Among them is a slice of territorial waters called the "Point 20 sliver" (see below), and previously, the sovereignty of Pulau Batu Puteh/Pedra Branca which lies within the  territorial waters claimed by Malaysia but has since been decided by the International Court of Justice in Singapore's favour.

With the award to Singapore of the sovereignty of the island, further determination of the maritime boundary between the two countries as well as with Indonesia whose territorial waters are also in the area, would have to be done to fill in the various gaps and determine the tripoints.

The area around Pedra Branca is expected to be complicated. Pedra Branca lies beyond the three nautical mile (6 km) zone claimed by Singapore but within the  zone claimed by Malaysia. Singapore has indicated that the Indonesia-Singapore and Malaysia–Singapore borders in this area would not run continuously from the waters adjacent to the main Singapore island to the Pedra Branca area and a stretch of the Indonesia-Malaysia border would lie in between. Further complications could arise by the awarding of Middle Rocks, which lies 0.6 nautical miles (1.5 km) south of Pedra Branca (i.e. away from the Johor coast), to Malaysia. A joint technical committee has been formed to determine the maritime border.

History
The border between Malaysia and Singapore only came into existence in the 19th century with the establishment and subsequently, cession of the island to the British East India Company by the Sultanate of Johor in 1824. Prior to that, Singapore was an integral part of the Johor Sultanate and subsequently, the Johor-Riau Sultanate.

The border changed from being an international border to a sub-national boundary (boundary of a division within a country) and vice versa several times. It became an international border after the cession of Singapore to the East India Company by Johor in 1824 as Johor was de jure a sovereign state. In 1914, the border became that of between two British-ruled territories when Johor became a British protectorate while Singapore remained a British crown colony.

On 31 August 1957, the Federation of Malaya (which consisted of only Peninsular Malaysia), which included Johor as a component state, became independent and the Johor–Singapore border again became an international boundary between the sovereign state of Malaya and the self-governing British territory of Singapore. On 16 September 1963, Singapore merged with and become a component state of Malaysia, rendering the border between two component states of Malaysia. The border again became an international border when Singapore was expelled from Malaysia on 9 August 1965, subsequently becoming independent, sovereign nation.

2020 Malaysia movement control order

On 16 March 2020, Malaysian Prime Minister Muhyiddin Yassin announced on television that Malaysia would implement a Movement Control Order in response to the COVID-19 pandemic, in what was described as Malaysia Partial Lockdown and Malaysia Lockdown in local and international media. This was in response to increasing COVID-19 cases in Malaysia.

On 17 March 2020, the Causeway was facing immense jams due to the movement control order, therefore after this date, movement was restricted between Singapore and Malaysia as cases in Malaysia continued to be high. On 1 April 2022, the Malaysia-Singapore border had reopened.
The flow of cargo, goods and food supplies had carried on as per normal.

On 1 April 2022, after more than two years of full closure, the Causeway and Second Link were finally reopened at both sides to all forms of private transportation. Travellers will have to be fully vaccinated while unvaccinated children under the age of 12 will have to accompanied by a fully-vaccinated guardian. Travellers can travel between the Malaysia-Singapore border for the purposes of family, business, and recreational trips.

Disputes
The Malaysian and Singaporean governments have been involved in a range of disputes and disagreements which had tested the bilateral relations between the two countries. Most of these, including that over Keretapi Tanah Melayu, or Malayan Railway, land in Singapore, are not territorial or border disputes as they do not involve questions of sovereignty over territory or territorial waters.

There have, however, been two disputes concerning sovereignty of territory along the Malaysia–Singapore border. The more well-known one is that over Pedra Branca, which the International Court of Justice decided in Singapore's favour on 23 May 2008. Another case arose from a "complaint" by Malaysia over reclamation carried out by Singapore at territorial waters adjacent to the border with Malaysia. The dispute was submitted to the International Tribunal for the Law of the Sea in Hamburg by Malaysia on 4 September 2003.

Sovereignty of Pedra Branca

Pedra Branca is a rock formation located at the eastern entrance to the Singapore Straits to the southeast of the southeastern tip of Johor, Malaysia. Together with two other marine features called Middle Rocks and South Ledge, they were subject to a sovereignty dispute between Malaysia and Singapore.

On 23 May 2008, the International Court of Justice decided that Singapore had sovereignty over Pedra Branca while Malaysia had sovereignty over Middle Rocks. It left the question of sovereignty over South Ledge, which only appears during low tide, to be determined later by stating that its sovereignty would depend on whose territorial waters it was located in. The decision settles a long-standing barrier to the negotiation process for the determination of the maritime boundary between the two countries and both Malaysia and Singapore said immediately after the ICJ decision that a joint technical committee would be set up to determine the maritime border in the waters around Pedra Branca.

Malaysia filed a review before the 10 year mark of the award in 2017, the review was subsequently withdrawn in 2018 by the new government putting the matter to rest.

Singaporean land reclamation case
This dispute resulted from Singapore's reclaiming of land in two areas, namely in the southwestern end of the island called the Tuas development, and in the waters adjacent to Pulau Tekong in the Straits of Johor. The latter does not involve any encroachment into the territorial waters of Malaysia, and Malaysia merely argued that the reclamation works would affect the environment of the Straits of Johor as a shared waterway.

The Tuas development, however, can be deemed a case of territorial dispute as Malaysia claims the reclamation works has encroached into its territorial waters in an area called the "Point 20 sliver".  The "sliver", regarded as an anomaly by Singapore, arises as a result of the unilateral declaration of Malaysia's territorial waters boundary as defined by a 1979 map published by Malaysia where, between turning points No 19 and No 21, Point 20 strikes out to the east of the general continental shelf boundary towards Singapore, thus forming a triangle of Malaysian territorial waters extending eastwards from the general north–south territorial waters boundary. The Tuas development reclamation project encroaches into this sliver of territorial waters. Singapore does not recognise the 1979 continental shelf boundary and, thus, does not recognise the "point 20 sliver" as under Malaysian sovereignty.

In 2003, Malaysia submitted a case to the International Tribunal for the Law of the Sea and requested for provisional measures against Singapore's reclamation works, including that concerning Point 20. On 8 October 2003, the tribunal decided that:

Malaysia has not shown that there is a situation of urgency or that there is a risk that its rights with respect to an area of its territorial sea would suffer irreversible damage pending consideration of the merits of the case by the arbitral tribunal. Therefore, the Tribunal does not consider it appropriate to prescribe provisional measures with respect to the land reclamation by Singapore in the sector of Tuas.

The other parts of the order covered the issue of land reclamation around Pulau Tekong, whereby the tribunal ordered the two countries to jointly establish a group of independent experts to come up with a report "within a period not exceeding one year from the date of this Order, the effects of Singapore’s land reclamation and to propose, as appropriate, measures to deal with any adverse effects of such land reclamation."

After a 13-month study, the group of experts reported that of 57 impacts identified, 40 could only be detected in a computer model but not likely to be detectable out in the field, while the remaining 17 impacts could be eliminated via prescribed mitigating measures. Singapore's Agent Professor Tommy Koh said, "The happy news, of course, is that the two delegations were able to agree on the appropriate way in which these recommendations would be implemented", which allowed both countries to come to an amicable solution which resulted in the termination of the arbitration proceedings. The Settlement Agreement was signed by both countries on 26 April 2005.

As for the Point 20 issue, which was not specifically touched on by the group of experts as it concerned the issue of delimitation of the Malaysia-Singapore maritime boundary, the two countries reached an agreement not to deal with the issue in this negotiation.

"We both agreed that this will be taken up subsequently, in other negotiations. In the meantime, both sides recognise that neither side has given up any rights they have under international law or their right to resort to other peaceful means of settling this outstanding dispute."

Border crossings

More than 450,000 people cross the Malaysia–Singapore border everyday, using the two land crossings across the Straits of Johor. This makes it one of the busiest land borders in the world.

Johor–Singapore Causeway

to the north of Singapore, the busiest border checkpoint in the world with 350,000 travellers daily.

Malaysia–Singapore Second Link

to the west of Singapore, known officially as Tuas Second Link in Singapore or Linkedua in Malaysia.

 There is also a sea crossing between Pengerang in Johor and Changi in Singapore.

Johor–Singapore Causeway
The Johor–Singapore Causeway is most used link between the two countries. It supports road and railway. It is the oldest physical link between the countries and was completed in 1923. Checkpoints for identity card checks were set up in 1966. Passport checks began in 1967.

There are different checkpoints for road and rail travellers respectively. Road travellers are processed at the Sultan Iskandar Complex on the Malaysian side, and Woodlands Checkpoint on the Singaporean side. Both immigration checkpoints replaced older facilities; the current Woodlands Checkpoint started operations in 1998, while the Sultan Iskandar Complex opened in 2008.

Railway crossing
The Malaysian railway operator, Keretapi Tanah Melayu (KTM), runs intercity railway services that extends to Singapore. Rail travellers are processed at the Woodlands Train Checkpoint (WTCP), which is separated from the Woodlands Checkpoint used by road travellers. Since 1 July 2011, WTCP was the southern terminus of the KTM rail network and the checkpoint houses both Malaysian and Singaporean border control facilities.

For decades, Tanjong Pagar railway station in downtown Singapore served as the southern terminus of the KTM rail network, with the railway land and the station under Malaysian ownership. Before 1998, both Malaysian and Singaporean border control facilities were co-located at the station. In 1998, Singapore opened the Woodlands Train Checkpoint and moved its immigration post there, the official reason being improving border security. However, Malaysia refused to move its immigration post to the WTCP or Johor Bahru, citing the move as a ploy to force Malaysia to hand over the railway land and the station as per the Malaysia–Singapore Points of Agreement of 1990, which the two countries interpret differently. Between 1998 and 2011, the border clearance for passengers travelling towards Malaysia was an anomaly, as they were granted entry to Malaysia at Tanjong Pagar railway station before passing through Singapore exit controls at WTCP. Passengers travelling to Singapore were not affected as they were already cleared by Malaysian authorities at Johor Bahru railway station before Singapore border control at WTCP. The dispute was resolved in 2010, with Malaysia relocating its immigration post to WTCP and handing over the railway land and also Tanjong Pagar railway station on 1 July 2011, in exchange for joint development of prime land in Singapore.

Malaysia–Singapore Second Link
The Second Link as the name suggests is the second road border crossing between the two countries. It connects Tuas on the Singapore side to Tanjung Kupang on the Malaysia side. It was completed and opened to traffic on 2 January 1998. The checkpoints are:

 Malaysia - Sultan Abu Bakar Complex
 Singapore - Tuas Checkpoint

Changi Point-Pengerang sea crossing
There is also a sea crossing between Malaysia and Singapore between Pengerang in the southeastern tip of Johor and Changi Point near Changi Village in the northeastern tip of Singapore. The Singapore immigration post in Changi Point was set up in November 1967.

See also
Indonesia–Malaysia border
Indonesia–Singapore border
Pedra Branca, Singapore

Notes

References

 
Borders of Malaysia
Borders of Singapore
International borders